Alfred L. Barker (January 18, 1839 – September 15, 1912) played one major league baseball game in 1871 for the Rockford Forest Citys of the National Association.

Barker was the starting left fielder for the Forest Citys on June 1, 1871, in a road game against the New York Mutuals.  In five plate appearances he went 1-for-4 (a single) with a walk and had two runs batted in.  In the field he made two putouts without an error.  Despite his efforts, his team lost, 7-3.

One of his teammates during his short stay with the club was future Hall of Famer Cap Anson.

Barker umpired three National League games in 1881.

A native of Lost Creek, Indiana, Barker died at the age of 72 in Rockford, Illinois.

External links

Retrosheet

19th-century baseball players
Major League Baseball left fielders
Rockford Forest Citys (NABBP) players
Rockford Forest Citys players
Baseball players from Indiana
People from Vigo County, Indiana
1839 births
1912 deaths